Henry Andres Burgevine (1836–1865) was an American sailor of French ancestry, mercenary and soldier of fortune, who became famous for his military victories for Imperial China during the Taiping Rebellion.

Family
According to Caleb Carr in his biography of Frederick Townsend Ward, Burgevine was the child of a French officer who had served under Napoleon Bonaparte and who had moved to Chapel Hill, North Carolina where he became an instructor in French at the University of North Carolina at Chapel Hill. His father, after having been caught misappropriating funds by the president of the university, then died in a brawl in South Carolina. Burgevine then lived with his grandparents and sister in Ashford, North Carolina.

Career
At age 7 Burgevine moved to Washington, D.C. with his mother and became a Congressional and then a senatorial page until 1853. After travels in India, Hawaii and Australia, he then returned to Washington and then enlisted in the French Army for the duration of the Crimean War, where he was decorated for bravery.

In the early stages of the Taiping Rebellion he sided with the Qing Army, serving as the deputy commander of Ever Victorious Army, and succeeding the commander, Frederick Townsend Ward to command the Ever Victorious Army after Ward's death in September 1863. Burgevine's assignment was against Ward's will, who wished his loyal Filipino subordinate Macanaya to succeed him as the commander, but the imperial Chinese court selected Burgevine instead.  However, Burgevine betrayed the Qing dynasty by later defecting and joining Li Shixian's army. He was later repatriated to the United States but he returned to China after completing half of his journey. On his return Qing police arrested him once again. In 1865 he drowned along with 10 Qing police in Xiamen's sea on the way to Shanghai, China, although some historians believed  that Burgevine was murdered on Li Hongzhang's orders.

Further reading
Biography Yankee Adventurer By Holger Cahill (1930)
Carr, Caleb Devil Soldier: The Story of Frederick Townsend Ward (1992)
Macgowan, D. J. Memoirs of Generals Ward, Burgevine and the Ever-Conquering Legion. 
Smith, Richard J. Mercenaries and Mandarins: The Ever-Victorious Army in Nineteenth Century China. (1978)
Spence, Jonathan D. God's Chinese Son, The Taiping Heavenly Kingdom of Hong Xiuquan (2002)
---. To Change China: Western Advisers in China (1969)

Sources
Draft History of Qing annals ch131 The American

American generals
Military leaders of the Taiping Rebellion
American sailors
1836 births
1865 deaths
People from McDowell County, North Carolina
American people of French descent
Deaths by drowning
American expatriates in Shanghai
Qing dynasty military personnel